Gabriel Grapperon is a French animator and filmmaker, best known for his computer-animated short film, Garden Party  (2017), for which he received critical acclaim and was co-nominated for Academy Award for Best Animated Short Film at 90th Academy Awards.

Gabriel Grapperon is co-founder of Illogic Studios.

Filmography 
 2017: Garden Party (Short) (director, sound editor) 
 2014: Last Minute Twists (TV Series) (1 episode)

References

External links
 

1990s births
Living people
French film producers
French film directors